Robert Stock may refer to:

 Robert Stock (baseball) (born 1989), American baseball pitcher
 Robert Stock (businessman) (1858-1912), German entrepreneur and telecommunications pioneer
 Robert Stock (tennis) (born 1944),  American tennis player